Robert Brown Parker (September 17, 1932 – January 18, 2010) was an American writer, primarily of fiction within the mystery/detective genre. His most famous works were the 40 novels written about the fictional private detective Spenser. ABC television network developed the television series Spenser: For Hire based on the character in the mid-1980s; a series of TV movies was also produced based on the character. His works incorporate encyclopedic knowledge of the Boston metropolitan area. The Spenser novels have been cited as influencing their own work and reviving and changing the detective genre by critics and bestselling authors  including Robert Crais, Harlan Coben, and Dennis Lehane.

Parker also wrote nine novels featuring the fictional character Jesse Stone, a Los Angeles police officer who moves to a small New England town; six novels with the fictional character Sunny Randall, a female private investigator; and four Westerns starring the duo Virgil Cole and Everett Hitch. The first was Appaloosa, made into a film starring Ed Harris and Viggo Mortensen.

Early life
Parker was born in Springfield, Massachusetts. In 1956, Parker married Joan H. Parker, whom he claimed to have met as a toddler at a birthday party. They spent their childhoods in the same neighborhood.

After earning a BA degree from Colby College in Waterville, Maine, Parker served as a soldier in the US Army Infantry in Korea. In 1957, he earned his master's degree in English literature from Boston University and then worked in advertising and technical writing until 1962. Parker received a PhD in English literature from Boston University in 1971. His dissertation, titled "The Violent Hero, Wilderness Heritage, and Urban Reality," discussed the exploits of fictional private-eye heroes created by Dashiell Hammett, Raymond Chandler, and Ross Macdonald.

Career
Parker wrote his first novel in 1971 while teaching at Northeastern University. He became a full professor in 1976, and turned to full-time writing in 1979, with five Spenser novels to his credit.

Parker's popular Spenser novels are known for his characters of varied races and religions. According to critic Christina Nunez, Parker's "inclusion of [characters of] other races and sexual persuasions" lends his writings a "more modern feel".  For example, the Spenser series characters include Hawk and Chollo, African-American and Mexican-American, respectively, as well as Spenser's Jewish girlfriend, Susan, various Russians, Ukrainians, Chinese, a gay cop, Lee Farrell, and even a gay mob boss, Gino Fish. The homosexuality of both his sons gave his writing "[a] sensibility," Ms. Nunez feels, "[which] strengthens Parker's sensibility [toward gays]." In 1985, Spenser was made into a successful television series, Spenser for Hire which starred Robert Urich, Avery Brooks and Barbara Stock.

In 1994, Parker collaborated with Japanese photographer Kasho Kumagai on a coffee table book called Spenser's Boston, exploring the city through Spenser's "eyes" via high quality, 4-color photos. In addition to Parker's introduction, excerpts from several of the Spenser novels were included.

Parker created female detective Sunny Randall at the request of actress Helen Hunt, who wanted him to write a part for her to play. He wrote the first book, and the film version was planned for 2000 but never materialized.  However, his publisher liked the character and asked him to continue with the series.

Another figure created by Parker was Jesse Stone, a troubled former LAPD detective, who starts a new career as a police chief in a small New England town. Between 1997 and 2010, he wrote nine novels featuring Jesse Stone, all of which have been adapted as a series of TV movies by CBS starring Tom Selleck as Jesse Stone.

Aside from crime writing, Parker also produced several Western novels, including Appaloosa, and children's books. Like Parker's Spenser series, his Westerns have received critical attention. Chris Dacus, who has written on other authors like Cormac McCarthy, has written of the intellectual depth and importance of Parker's Westerns in The Stoic Western Hero: Robert B. Parker's Westerns.

Parker and his wife created an independent film company called Pearl Productions, based in Boston. It was named after their German short-haired pointer, Pearl.

Personal life
Parker and his wife had two sons, David and Daniel.  Originally, the character of Spenser was to have been called "David," but Parker didn't want to appear to favor one of his sons over the other.  Parker therefore omitted Spenser's first name entirely, and it was never revealed.

Parker and his wife, Joan, separated at one point but then came to an unusual arrangement. They lived in a three-story Victorian house just outside of Harvard Square; she lived on one floor and he on another, and they shared the middle floor. This living arrangement is mirrored in Spenser's private life: his girlfriend, Susan, had an aversion to marriage and living together full-time. Living separately suited them both, although they were fully committed to each other. Explaining the arrangement in an interview on CBS Sunday Morning, Parker said, "I want to make love to my wife for the rest of my life, but I never want to sleep with her again."

He had a great fondness for dogs, including German Shorthair Pointers. Dogs were included in his Spenser stories, aging along with the character and appearing in the ongoing series of novels. The dogs were always named Pearl.

Awards
Parker received three nominations and two Edgar Awards from the Mystery Writers of America.  He received the first award, the "Best Novel Award" in 1977, for the fourth novel in the Spenser series, Promised Land.  In 1983, he received the Maltese Falcon Award, Japan, for Early Autumn.  In 1990 he shared, with wife Joan, a nomination for "Best Television Episode" for the TV series B.L. Stryker; however, the award went to David J. Burke and Alfonse Ruggiero Jr. for Wiseguy.

In 2002, he received the Grand Master Award Edgar for his collective oeuvre.

Parker received the 2002 Joseph E. Connor Memorial Award from the Phi Alpha Tau Fraternity at Emerson College. He was inducted into the fraternity as an honorary brother in Spring 2003.

In 2008, he was awarded the Gumshoe Lifetime Achievement Award.

Death
Parker was 77 when he died suddenly of a heart attack at his home in Cambridge, Massachusetts, on January 18, 2010; discovered at his desk by his wife Joan, he had been working on a novel.

Joan Parker, the inspiration for the Susan Silverman character in the Spenser series, died June 12, 2013. 

Later written by Ace Atkins, the Spenser series continued following Parker's death. The Boston Globe wrote that while some people might have "viewed the move as unseemly, those people didn’t know Robert B. Parker, a man who, when asked how his books would be viewed in 50 years, replied: 'Don’t know, don’t care.' He was proud of his work, but he mainly saw writing as a means of providing a comfortable life for his family."

Bibliography

Novels

Series continuations
After Parker died, his family, together with Parker's publishers, chose to continue the Jesse Stone, Spenser and Virgil Cole and Everett Hitch series. 

Ace Atkins was selected to continue the Spenser novels.  The book Parker was working on at the time of his death was completed by his literary agent Helen Bran. 

Eleven Jesse Stone novels  have been published since Parker's death.  The first three were by Parker's longtime friend and collaborator, Michael Brandman, and the next six by Reed Farrel Coleman.  Mike Lupica wrote the 10th in 2020 and eleventh in 2021.

Parker's Virgil Cole and Everett Hitch was continued by actor and screenwriter Robert Knott.

The Sunny Randall series continued with Blood Feud (November 27, 2018) and Grudge Match (May 4, 2020).   The books were written by Parker's friend, sports journalist Mike Lupica.

Non-fiction
 Sports Illustrated Training with Weights (with John R. Marsh) (1974) 
 Three Weeks in Spring (with Joan H. Parker) (1982) 
 A Year At The Races (with Joan H. Parker) (1990) 
 Spenser's Boston (with Kasho Kumagai) (1994)

Short fiction
"Surrogate"' (1991)" A short story published in the crime anthology New Crimes 3

References

External links

 
 Robert B. Parker at Internet Book List/Internet Book List :: Home
 Robert B Parker – Daily Telegraph obituary
 "Looking for Robert B. Parker: A Fond Farewell to the Man Who Saved P.I. Fiction," Part I and Part II - The Rap Sheet

1932 births
2010 deaths
20th-century American novelists
21st-century American novelists
American mystery writers
Boston University College of Arts and Sciences alumni
Colby College alumni
Anthony Award winners
Edgar Award winners
Maltese Falcon Award winners
Shamus Award winners
Northeastern University faculty
Writers from Cambridge, Massachusetts
Writers from Springfield, Massachusetts
American male novelists
20th-century American male writers
21st-century American male writers
Novelists from Massachusetts